Nios was Altera's first configurable 16-bit embedded processor for its FPGA product-line. For new designs, Altera recommends the 32-bit Nios II.

See also 
 LatticeMico8
 LatticeMico32
 MicroBlaze
 PicoBlaze
 Micon P200

References 

Soft microprocessors